The junggeum (also spelled chunggum or chunggŭm) is a medium-sized transverse bamboo flute formerly used in traditional Korean music. Unlike the larger daegeum, it does not have a buzzing membrane (although it did have one in ancient times). It was used in court, aristocratic, and folk music, but has largely died out, being rarely used today.

Other flutes in the same family include the daegeum and sogeum; the three together are known as samjuk (hangul: 삼죽; hanja: 三竹; literally "three bamboo"), as the three primary flutes of the Silla period. Both of these are still used in traditional music, as well as in contemporary classical music, popular music, and film scores.

The junggeum currently used in the National Gugak Center is about 65cm long and 1.7cm in diameter.

See also
Bamboo musical instruments
Daegeum
Dizi
Music of Korea
Sogeum
Traditional Korean musical instruments

References

External links
Junggeum page

Side-blown flutes
Korean musical instruments
Bamboo flutes